A Fabergé egg is a jewelled egg created by the jewellery firm House of Fabergé, in Saint Petersburg, Russia. As many as 69 were created, of which 57 survive today. Virtually all were manufactured under the supervision of Peter Carl Fabergé between 1885 and 1917. The most famous are his 52 "Imperial" eggs, 46 of which survive, made for the Russian Tsars Alexander III and Nicholas II as Easter gifts for their wives and mothers. Fabergé eggs are worth millions of dollars and have become symbols of opulence.

History
The House of Fabergé was founded by Gustav Fabergé in 1842 in St. Petersburg, Russia. The Fabergé egg was a later addition to the product line by his son, Peter Carl Fabergé.

Prior to 1885, Tsar Alexander III gave his wife Empress Maria Feodorovna jeweled Easter eggs. For Easter in 1883, before his coronation, Alexander III and Maria Feodorovna were given eggs, one of which contained a silver dagger and two skulls. The egg came with messages including "Christ is risen" and "You may crush us—but we Nihilists shall rise again!"

Before Easter 1885, Alexander III's brother Grand Duke Vladimir Alexandrovich suggested that Peter Carl Fabergé create a jeweled egg. This type of egg is believed to have been inspired by an ivory hen egg made for the Danish Royal Collection in the 18th century. Known as the Hen Egg, it has a 2.5-inch outer enamel shell and a golden band around the middle. The egg opens to reveal a golden "yolk" within, which opened to reveal a golden hen sitting on golden straw. Inside the hen lay a miniature diamond replica of the Imperial crown and a ruby pendant, though these two elements have been lost. It was given to the tsarina on 1 May 1885. The egg cost 4,151 rubles. Six weeks later, the tsar made Fabergé the supplier to the Imperial Court.

Maria was so delighted by the gift that Alexander appointed Fabergé a "goldsmith by special appointment to the Imperial Crown" and commissioned another egg the next year. After that, Peter Carl Fabergé was apparently given complete freedom to design future imperial Easter eggs, and their designs became more elaborate. According to Fabergé family lore, not even the Tsar knew what form they would take—the only requirements were that each contain a surprise, and that each be unique. Once Fabergé had approved an initial design, the work was carried out by a team of craftsmen, among them Michael Perkhin, Henrik Wigström, and Erik August Kollin.

After Alexander III's death on 1 November 1894, his son, Nicholas II, presented a Fabergé egg to both his wife, Alexandra Fedorovna, and his mother, the Dowager Empress Maria Fedorovna. Records have shown that of the 50 imperial Easter eggs, 20 were given to the former and 30 to the latter.  Eggs were made each year except 1904 and 1905, during the Russo-Japanese War.

The imperial eggs enjoyed great fame. Fabergé was commissioned to make similar eggs for a few private clients, including the Duchess of Marlborough, the Rothschild family, and the Yusupovs. Fabergé was also commissioned to make twelve eggs for the industrialist Alexander Kelch, though only seven appear to have been completed.

Following the revolution and the nationalization of the Fabergé workshop in St. Petersburg by the Bolsheviks in 1918, the Fabergé family left Russia. The Fabergé trademark has since been sold several times, and several companies have retailed egg-related merchandise using the Fabergé name. From 1998 to 2009, the Victor Mayer jewelry company produced limited-edition Fabergé eggs authorized under Unilever's license. The trademark is now owned by Fabergé Limited, which makes egg-themed jewelry.

List of eggs

List of Fabergé imperial Easter eggs
Below is a chronology of the eggs made for the imperial family. The dating of the eggs has evolved. An earlier chronology dated the Blue Serpent Clock Egg to 1887 and identified the egg of 1895 as the Twelve Monograms Egg. The discovery of the previously lost Third Imperial Easter Egg confirms the chronology below.

List of the Kelch eggs
Faberge was also commissioned to make eggs for Alexander Ferdinandovich Kelch, a Siberian gold mine industrialist, as gifts for his wife Barbara (Varvara) Kelch-Bazanova.  Though still "Fabergé eggs" by virtue of having been produced by his workshop, these eggs were not as elaborate as the imperial eggs, and were not unique in design.  Most are copies of other eggs.

Other Fabergé eggs

Location of eggs
Of the 69 known Fabergé eggs, 57 have survived to the present day. Ten of the imperial Easter eggs are displayed at Moscow's Kremlin Armory Museum. Of the 50 delivered imperial eggs, 44 have survived, and there are photographs of three of the six lost eggs: the 1903 Royal Danish Egg, the 1909 Alexander III Commemorative Egg, and the Nécessaire Egg of 1889. The previously lost Third Imperial Easter Egg of 1887 has since been found in the US and bought by Wartski for a private collector. All six of the missing Imperial Eggs belonged to Maria Feodorovna.

After the Russian Revolution, the Bolsheviks nationalized the House of Fabergé, and the Fabergé family fled to Switzerland, where Peter Carl Fabergé died in 1920. The imperial family's palaces were ransacked and their treasures moved to the Kremlin Armoury on order of Vladimir Lenin.

In a bid to acquire more foreign currency, Joseph Stalin had many of the eggs sold in 1927, after their value had been appraised by Agathon Carl Theodor Fabergé. Between 1930 and 1933, 14 imperial eggs left Russia. Many of the eggs were sold to Armand Hammer (president of Occidental Petroleum and a personal friend of Lenin, whose father was founder of the United States Communist Party) and to Emanuel Snowman of the London antique dealers Wartski.

After the collection in the Kremlin Armoury, the largest gathering of Fabergé eggs was assembled by Malcolm Forbes, and displayed in New York City. Totaling nine eggs, and approximately 180 other Fabergé objects, the collection was to be put up for auction at Sotheby's in February 2004 by Forbes' heirs. However, before the auction began, the collection was purchased in its entirety by the oligarch Viktor Vekselberg. In a 2013 BBC Four documentary, Vekselberg revealed he had spent just over $100 million purchasing the nine Fabergé eggs. He claims never to have displayed them in his home, saying he bought them as they are important to Russian history and culture, and he believed them to be the best jewelry art in the world. In the same BBC documentary, Vekselberg revealed he plans to open a museum that will display the eggs in his collection, which was built as a private Fabergé Museum in Saint Petersburg, Russia on 19 November 2013.

In November 2007, a Fabergé clock, named by Christie's auction house as the Rothschild Egg, sold at auction for £8.9  million ($16.5 million) (including commission). The price achieved by the egg set three auction records: it is the most expensive timepiece, Russian object, and Fabergé object ever sold at auction, surpassing the $9.6 million sale of the 1913 Winter Egg in 2002.

In 1989, as part of the San Diego Arts Festival, 26 Fabergé eggs were loaned for display at the San Diego Museum of Art, the largest exhibition of Fabergé eggs anywhere since the Russian Revolution. The eggs included eight from the Kremlin, nine from the Forbes collection, three from the New Orleans Museum of Art, two from the Royal Collection one from the Cleveland Museum of Art and three from private collections.

Location of the "Imperial" eggs

Location of the Kelch eggs

Location of the other eggs

In popular culture
Fabergé eggs have acquired a cult status in the art world and popular culture. Featured in exhibitions, films, TV series, documentaries, cartoons, publications, and the news, they continue to intrigue. They have become symbols of the splendor, power and wealth of the Romanov dynasty and the Russian Empire, priceless treasures to hunt, steal, etc.

As such, they have been part of the plot in several films and television series, including Octopussy (1983), Mr. Belvedere ("Strike" episode, 1985), Love Among Thieves (1987), Murder She Wrote episode "An Egg to Die For" (1994), The Simpsons episode 'Round Springfield" (1995) (in which jazz musician Bleeding Gums Murphy talks about his addiction to buying Fabergé eggs), Case Closed: The Last Wizard of the Century (1999), The Order (2001), Relic Hunter episode "M.I.A." (2001), Ocean's Twelve (2004), The Simpsons episode "The Last of the Red Hat Mamas" (2005),Thick as Thieves (2009), a 2010 episode of the TV series Leverage ("The Zanzibar Marketplace Job"), the American Dad! episode "A Jones for a Smith" (2010), The Intouchables (2011), Hustle episode "Eat Yourself Slender" (2012), Scooby Doo! Mystery Incorporated episode "The House of the Nightmare Witch" (2012), Person of Interest episode "Search and Destroy" (2015), Imperial Eight (2015), the British crime drama series Peaky Blinders ("Lilies of the Valley" egg, season 3, episode 6, 2016), Hooten & the Lady episode "Moscow" (2016), Game Night (2018), Between Two Ferns: The Movie (2019), Eurovision Song Contest: The Story of Fire Saga (2020), Lupin (2021) and Bhamakalapam (2022).

In Danielle Steele's 1988 novel Zoya, a Fabergé egg is a keepsake of the last two remaining members of a noble family. The 2011 digital card game Cabals: Magic & Battle Cards features Fabergé egg as a collectible card. In 2017, visual artist Jonathan Monaghan exhibited a series of digital prints re-interpreting Fabergé eggs in humorous and surreal ways at The Walters Art Museum in Baltimore.

In M. J. Rose's 2021 novel The Last Tiara, the main character discovers a Fabergé tiara in her late mother's apartment. This discovery sets her off on a journey to discover how the tiara came into her mother's possession and if her father, a Fabergé workman, was involved.

See also

Tatiana Fabergé
Fauxbergé
Egg decorating
Guilloché
Argyle Library Egg

References

Footnotes

Citations

Bibliography

Further reading

External links
Fabergé Imperial Egg Chronology at Fabergé Research Site by Christel Ludewig McCanless
Empress Marie Feodorovna's Missing Fabergé Easter Eggs, article by Annemiek Wintraecken and Christel Ludewing McCanless 
Playlist on Fabergé eggs; documentaries, lectures, etc.
Details on each of the Fabergé Eggs
BYU article on the eggs 
Site by Annemiek Wintraecken, details on each of the Fabergé Eggs
 BBC: Fabergé: The iconic maker of bespoke jewellery

 
Decorative arts